Kenny Leon is an American director, producer, actor, and author, notable for his work on Broadway, on television, and in regional theater. In 2014, he won the Tony Award for Best Direction of a Play for A Raisin in the Sun.

Career
He gained prominence in 1990, when he became one of the few African Americans to head a notable nonprofit theater company as the artistic director of Atlanta's Alliance Theatre Company. During Leon's tenure, the company staged premieres of Pearl Cleage's Blues for an Alabama Sky, Alfred Uhry's The Last Night of Ballyhoo, and Elton John and Tim Rice's musical Aida, which went on to Broadway. The Alliance's endowment also rose from $1 to $5 million during his time there.

Leon resigned from the Alliance in 2000 to take on other projects. These included being the co-founder and artistic director of True Colors Theatre Company, a group based in both Atlanta and Washington, D.C. He also took his talents to Broadway. In the spring of 2004, he directed a revival of Lorraine Hansberry's A Raisin in the Sun, starring Sean Combs, Phylicia Rashad and Audra McDonald in his Broadway debut. At the end of that year, he directed the Broadway premiere of August Wilson's Gem of the Ocean. In 2005, he directed Margaret Garner, an opera by Richard Danielpour with a libretto by Toni Morrison. In spring 2007, he directed August Wilson's Radio Golf. All three plays were nominated for Tony Awards, and Leon was a Drama Desk Award nominee for A Raisin in the Sun. He also directed the television version of A Raisin in the Sun, which aired on ABC in February 2008. He was nominated for a Tony Award in 2010 for Best Director for his work on August Wilson's Fences, starring Denzel Washington and Viola Davis, earning them both nominations and wins for Best Performance for Male and Female in a Play.

In November 2010, Leon directed Phylicia Rashad in the world premiere stage play Every Tongue Confess written by Marcus Gardley, which ran at the Arena Stage in Washington, D.C.

Leon has also directed plays at the Cincinnati Playhouse in the Park, the Huntington Theatre Company in Boston, the New York Shakespeare Festival, the Goodman Theatre in Chicago, and other venues.

In January 2012, he completed a Lifetime Original Television remake of Steel Magnolias. Other projects at that time included the world premiere of a staged adaptation of the 1967 film Guess Who's Coming to Dinner at the Kenny Leon's True Colors Theatre Company; and a musical inspired by the work of rapper Tupac Shakur.

In 2014, he directed the Broadway revival of A Raisin in the Sun starring Denzel Washington and LaTanya Richardson Jackson and the Broadway premiere of the musical Holler If Ya Hear Me, featuring the discography of Tupac Shakur. A Raisin in the Sun earned Leon a Tony Award for Best Direction of a Play. That same year Leon directed NPR Presents Water±, written by award-winning NPR Science Correspondent Christopher Joyce, and award-winning theater writers Arthur Yorinks and Carl Hancock Rux, with an original sound score by violinist Daniel Bernard Roumain (DBR). The show toured nationally, co-hosted by NPR's Michele Norris and WWNO's Eve Troeh and featuring Tony Award-winner Anika Noni Rose (Caroline, or Change); Tony Award-nominee Michele Shay (August Wilson's Seven Guitars); Jason Dirden (Tony Award-winning production A Raisin in the Sun); and Lucas Caleb Rooney (Boardwalk Empire).

In 2015, Leon directed the live musical The Wiz for NBC. Cirque du Soleil partnered on the production with plans to bring the show to Broadway. He was slated to direct both the television production and the planned Broadway revival. In 2016, Leon once again partnered with NBC for Hairspray: Live!, starring Ariana Grande, Jennifer Hudson, Kristin Chenoweth, and Harvey Fierstein.

In addition to his directing experience, he has extensive acting experience on stage and in television and film. He made an appearance in the Hollywood Black Film Festival winner Big Ain't Bad, playing the role of Thomas Jordan, the mayor of Atlanta.

His memoir, Take You Wherever You Go, was released in June, 2018, by Grand Central Publishing. The title derives advice he received from his grandmother, Mamie Wilson.

Leon directed the 2019 Netflix film American Son, based on the play of the same name which he had directed on stage.

Most recently, he directed the Broadway premiere of Charles Fuller's Pulitzer Prize winning masterpiece, A Soldier's Play, starring Blair Underwood and David Alan Grier at Roundabout Theatre Company. He also directed The Underlying Chris at Second Stage Theatre Company and this past summer’s acclaimed production of Much Ado About Nothing at the Delacorte/Shakespeare in the Park. In May 2022, the Alliance Theatre in Atlanta debuted "Trading Places: The Musical!" directed by Leon.

Education

Leon participated in the federally funded TRIO Upward Bound college-prep program while in high school. He is a graduate of Clark Atlanta University.

Honors

In 2004, People named him one of the "50 Most Beautiful People" of the year.

In 2007, he was a recipient of the 2007 Georgia Arts and Entertainment Legacy Award for his contributions to Georgia's cultural legacy.

In 2010, Leon won the Drama League's award for Excellence in Directing for the play Fences.

In 2014 he won the Tony Award for Best Direction of a Play for A Raisin in the Sun.

Leon was awarded the 2016-2017 "Mr. Abbott" Award for outstanding artistry and creativity, which is presented by the Stage Directors and Choreographers (SDC) Foundation, in recognition for his over 40-year career.

In October 2017, Leon was the recipient the Governor's Award for the Arts and Humanities for the State of Georgia.

He held the Denzel Washington Endowed Chair in Theatre at Fordham University, previously held by Joe Morton and Phylicia Rashad.

Works

Television
As a director

As an actor

Stage
As a director

Awards and nominations

References

External links
Kenny Leon Productions

African-American film directors
African-American television directors
American television directors
American theatre directors
Broadway theatre directors
Clark Atlanta University alumni
Living people
1956 births
People from Tallahassee, Florida
Film directors from Florida
Tony Award winners
21st-century African-American people
20th-century African-American people